Anopinella rica is a species of moth of the family Tortricidae. It is found in Costa Rica.

The length of the forewings is 7.0–8.1 mm.

External links
Systematic revision of Anopinella Powell (Lepidoptera: Tortricidae: Euliini) and phylogenetic analysis of the Apolychrosis group of genera

Anopinella
Moths of Central America
Moths described in 2003